The Chief's Blanket is a 1912 American short silent Western film directed by D. W. Griffith, starring Blanche Sweet and Lionel Barrymore.

Cast
 Lionel Barrymore as The Young Man
 Blanche Sweet as The Young Woman
 W. Chrystie Miller as The Father
 Charles West as The Outlaw (as Charles H. West)
 Alfred Paget as The Unfaithful Sentinel
 Adolph Lestina as The Doctor
 Walter P. Lewis as The Indian Chief
 Charles Gorman as An Indian
 Wilfred Lucas
 Joseph McDermott as Among Settlers
 Jack Pickford as An Indian
 W. C. Robinson as An Indian
 Hector Sarno as An Indian (as Hector V. Sarno)

See also
 List of American films of 1912
 D. W. Griffith filmography
 Blanche Sweet filmography
 Lionel Barrymore filmography

References

External links
 

1912 films
1912 Western (genre) films
1912 short films
American silent short films
American black-and-white films
Films directed by D. W. Griffith
Silent American Western (genre) films
1910s American films